Casa Fontana-Silvestri is one of the few Renaissance buildings surviving in Milan, Italy. The main structure dates back to the 12th century, but its current form is due to a thorough modification that were made at the end of the 14th century, in a style that mixes Renaissance and Gothic elements. 

The facade was originally decorated with frescos that scholars credit to Bramante or Bramantino; most of these painting have disappeared, with just a few remnants now visible under the cornice. It has also been suggested that Bramante may have designed the cotto decorations, also on the facade.

References
 A. Lanza, M. Somarè, Milano e suoi palazzi - Porta Orientale, Romana e Ticinese, Libreria Milanese, pp. 28-30

Palaces in Milan
Renaissance architecture in Milan